Staromukhametovo (İśke Möxämät) is a rural locality (a village) in Ibrayevsky Selsoviet, Kiginsky District, Bashkortostan, Russia. The population was 460 as of 2010. There are 7 streets.

Geography 
Staromukhametovo is located 21 km southwest of Verkhniye Kigi (the district's administrative centre) by road. Yagunovo is the nearest rural locality.

References 

Rural localities in Kiginsky District